Carolina Rincon (born January 9, 1984) is a Mexican actress from Navojoa, Sonora. She debuted on the Big Brother reality show. In 2006 she began playing the role of Venus Carvajal in the telenovela "Codigo Postal".

External links

1984 births
Living people
21st-century Mexican actresses
Mexican television actresses
Actresses from Sonora
People from Navojoa